In abstract algebra, a normal extension is an algebraic field extension L/K for which every irreducible polynomial over K which has a root in L, splits into linear factors in L. These are one of the conditions for algebraic extensions to be a Galois extension. Bourbaki calls such an extension a quasi-Galois extension.

Definition 
Let  be an algebraic extension (i.e. L is an algebraic extension of K), such that  (i.e. L is contained in an algebraic closure of K). Then the following conditions, any of which can be regarded as a definition of normal extension, are equivalent:
 Every embedding of L in  induces an automorphism of L.

Other properties 

Let L be an extension of a field K. Then:

 If L is a normal extension of K and if E is an intermediate extension (that is, L ⊃ E ⊃ K), then L is a normal extension of E.
 If E and F are normal extensions of K contained in L, then the compositum EF and E ∩ F are also normal extensions of K.

Equivalent conditions for normality 

Let  be algebraic. The field L is a normal extension if and only if any of the equivalent conditions below hold.

 The minimal polynomial over K of every element in L splits in L;
 There is a set  of polynomials that simultaneously split over L, such that if  are fields, then S has a polynomial that does not split in F;
 All homomorphisms  have the same image;
 The group of automorphisms,  of L which fixes elements of K, acts transitively on the set of homomorphisms

Examples and counterexamples 

For example,  is a normal extension of  since it is a splitting field of  On the other hand,  is not a normal extension of  since the irreducible polynomial  has one root in it (namely), but not all of them (it does not have the non-real cubic roots of 2). Recall that the field  of algebraic numbers is the algebraic closure of  that is, it contains  Since, 
 
and, if  is a primitive cubic root of unity, then the map

However,  is not an automorphism of 

For any prime  the extension  is normal of degree  It is a splitting field of  Here  denotes any th primitive root of unity. The field  is the normal closure (see below) of

Normal closure

If K is a field and L is an algebraic extension of K, then there is some algebraic extension M of L such that M is a normal extension of K. Furthermore, up to isomorphism there is only one such extension which is minimal, that is, the only subfield of M which contains L and which is a normal extension of K is M itself. This extension is called the normal closure of the extension L of K.

If L is a finite extension of K, then its normal closure is also a finite extension.

See also 

 Galois extension
 Normal basis

Citations

References 
 
 

Field extensions